J. Keith Radecic (born December 24, 1963) is a former center in the National Football League. He played for the St. Louis Cardinals in 1987. His brother Scott also played at Penn State and in the NFL for the Kansas City Chiefs, Buffalo Bills and Indianapolis Colts from 1984-1995.

References 

Living people
Penn State Nittany Lions football players
Players of American football from Pittsburgh
1963 births
American football centers
Washington Redskins players
St. Louis Cardinals (football) players
National Football League replacement players